This is a list of missionaries to the South Pacific islands. See also Bible translations into Oceanic languages.

Protestant
 Charles Scarborough (1927–2002) from England to Gilbert Islands
 Samuel Marsden (1765–1838) - from England to Australia
 Henry Nott (1774–1844) - from Britain to Tahiti
 Thomas Kendall (1778–1832) - from England to New Zealand
 Lancelot Edward Threlkeld (1788–1859) - from England to Tahiti and Australia
 Henry Williams (1792–1867) - from England to New Zealand
 John Williams (1796–1839) - from England to Tahiti and Samoa
 Robert Clark Morgan (1798–1864) - ship captain to South Australia, New Hebrides
 George Platt (missionary) - from England? to Tahiti and Samoa (not to be confused with George Pratt)
 Aaron Buzacott (1800–1864) - from England to Rarotonga
 Alfred Nesbitt Brown (1803–1884) - from England to New Zealand
 William Gilbert Puckey (1805–1878) - from England to New Zealand
 George Augustus Selwyn (1809–1878) - first Anglican Bishop of New Zealand
 Thomas Powell (botanist) (1809–1887) - from England to Samoa
 William Colenso (1811–1899) - from England to New Zealand
 Samuel Wilson (missionary translator) (c.1812 – after 1840) - from Tahiti (English) to Samoa
 William Charles Cotton (1813–1879) - from England to New Zealand
 Octavius Hadfield (1814–1904) - from Isle of Wight to New Zealand
 John Geddie (missionary) (1815–1872) - from Canada to Vanuatu
 Charles Hardie (c.1816 – after 1843) - from England to Samoa
 George Pratt (1817–1894) - from England to Samoa
 George Turner (missionary) (1818–1891) - from England to Samoa
 Carl Sylvius Völkner (c. 1819–1865) - from Germany to New Zealand
 Carl Wilhelm Schmidt (?–1864) - from Germany to Queensland and Samoa
 William Bambridge (1820–1879) - from England to New Zealand
 Elizabeth Fairburn Colenso (1821–1904) - from England to New Zealand
 George N. Gordon (1822–1861) - from Canada to Vanuatu
 John Gibson Paton (1824–1907) - from Scotland to New Hebrides
 John Coleridge Patteson (1827–1871) - from England to Bishop of Melanesia
Peter Milne (missionary) (1834-1924) - from Scotland to New Hebrides
George Brown (1835–1917) - from England to Samoa
 Shirley Waldemar Baker (1836–1903) - from England to Australia and Tonga
 James Cosh (1838–1900) -  from Scotland to Vanuatu
 William George Lawes (1839–1907) - from England to Papua New Guinea
 James Chalmers (1841–1901) - from Scotland to New Hebrides and New Guinea
 Oscar Michelsen (1844–1936) - from Norway to Vanuatu
 Florence Young (1856–1940) - from New Zealand to  China and the Solomon Islands
 Joseph Copeland (1866-1876) - from Scotland to Vanuatu (Tanna, Aneityum, Futuna)
 John William Gunn (1883-1918) - from Scotland to Vanuatu (Futuna)
 Philip Delaporte - from Germany to Nauru
 David Hand (1918–2006) - first Anglican Bishop of Papua New Guinea
 J. Graham Miller (1913–2008) - from New Zealand and Australia, to New Hebrides
 Don Richardson (1935–2018) - from Canada, to Netherlands New Guinea

See also
List of missionaries to Hawaii
Christian missionaries in New Zealand
Christian missionaries in Oceania

References

List
South Pacific